HMAS Bowen (J285/M285), named for the town of Bowen, Queensland, was a  of the Royal Australian Navy.

Design and construction

In 1938, the Australian Commonwealth Naval Board (ACNB) identified the need for a general purpose 'local defence vessel' capable of both anti-submarine and mine-warfare duties, while easy to construct and operate. Construction of the prototype  did not go ahead, but the plans were retained. The need for locally built 'all-rounder' vessels at the start of World War II saw the "Australian Minesweepers" (designated as such to hide their anti-submarine capability, but popularly referred to as "corvettes") approved in September 1939, with 60 constructed during the course of the war: 36 (including Bowen) ordered by the RAN, 20 ordered by the British Admiralty but manned and commissioned as RAN vessels, and 4 for the Royal Indian Navy.

Bowen was laid down by Walkers Limited at Maryborough, Queensland on 9 February 1942, launched on 11 June 1942 by Mrs. Crittal and commissioned on 9 November 1942.

Operational history
The corvette operated in the South West Pacific area during World War II, and earned the battle honours "Pacific 1942–45" and "New Guinea 1943–44" for her service.

Fate
Bowen paid off on 17 January 1946 and was sold for scrap to the Hong Kong Rolling Mills on 18 May 1956.

Citations

References

Books

Journal and news articles

External links

Bathurst-class corvettes of the Royal Australian Navy
Ships built in Queensland
1942 ships
World War II corvettes of Australia